Thota Sitarama Lakshmi (born 12 September 1951 Uppuluru, West Godavari district, Andhra Pradesh  ) is an Indian politician from Telugu Desam Party who presently represents the party as a Member of Parliament (Rajya Sabha) from Andhra Pradesh, India.

Before her term as the Parliamentarian, she served as the Bhimavaram municipal Chairperson 2005–2010. She is also TDP District party President for West Godavari in Andhra Pradesh from 2009 to till.

Her term as MP is from 10 April 2014 to 9 April 2020.

She has four daughters and one son.

See also 
 Rajya Sabha members from Andhra Pradesh

References

Telugu politicians
Telugu Desam Party politicians
Living people
Rajya Sabha members from Andhra Pradesh
Women in Andhra Pradesh politics
1951 births
People from West Godavari district
21st-century Indian women politicians
21st-century Indian politicians
Women members of the Rajya Sabha